Uzbekistan Pro League (Uzbek: O'zbekiston Pro Ligasi) is a professional football league in Uzbekistan, and currently the second level after the Uzbekistan Super League.

History

Since the foundation in 1992 and until the end of 2017 was called the "Uzbekistan First League" (Uzbek: O'zbekiston Birinchi ligasi / Ўзбекистон Биринчи лигаси; Russian: Первая лига Узбекистана).

Structure of the league
On 21 November 2017 according to the UzPFL management decision the Uzbekistan First League was officially renamed to Uzbekistan Pro League starting from the 2018 season. The league has been reduced from 18 (2017) to 16 teams.

In 2018 in the Pro League Uzbekistan involved 16 teams in a double round system (30 rounds), home and away. The winner of the Uzbekistan Pro League receives the permit in the Uzbekistan Super League, and the club took second place in the Pro League gets a place in the play-offs, consisting of two matches (home and away) where his opponent will be the Super League club, who took there the penultimate eleventh place. The winner of the playoffs gets a chance in Super League Uzbekistan, and the losing club will start the new season in the Pro League Uzbekistan. The clubs finishing in last place in the Pro League, will start the season in the Uzbekistan Pro-B League — the third level and the importance of football in the country.

The division is run by Uzbekistan Professional Football League(UzPFL) and Uzbekistan Football Association (UFA).

Teams

Winners and promotions by season

1:In the season 1999 additionally to the first second teams also promoted to Uzbek League: Qizilqum Zarafshon and Aral Nukus.
2:The winner and runner-up team of season 2009 did not promoted to Uzbek League because the number of teams of Top League was reduced from 16 to 14 for upcoming 2010 season.
3:FK Guliston could not enter the 2012 Uzbek League as runner-up team and was replaced by Qizilqum Zarafshon because of financial problems.

Coaches of promoted teams

 In the season 1999 four teams promoted to Uzbek League

References

External links 
Championat.uz: Standings and results
pfl.uz: First league results
Soccerway.com; Standings, Fixtures & Results

 
2
Second level football leagues in Asia
Sports leagues established in 1992
1992 establishments in Uzbekistan